Sonaram Chutia (also known as Vaishnav Pandit) was a Vaishnav scholar, freedom fighter and educationist from Assam, India. Born in Bamkukurachowa village in the Jorhat district of Assam during the British Raj, Chutia was educated in Jorhat and completed his B.Sc from Cotton College. Throughout his education, Chutia witnessed insulting comments from upper-caste boys and instances of disrespectful mistreatment from religious establishments towards certain communities.  It is said that these experiences prompted Chutia to take up his cause against casteism and racism.

Sutiya began his career as a science teacher at the Sivasagar Government Higher Secondary School in 1939 but left his job and joined the Jatiya Mahasabha.
He was jailed during the Quit India Movement,
and he met Pitambar Deva Goswami, Satradhikar of the Garmurh Satra, in prison in 1943. In 1946, Sutiya joined the Srimanta Sankaradeva Sangha, devoting himself to working for the organisation for the rest of his life.

Sutiya was honoured as a freedom fighter by the Union government in 1972 and the government of Assam in 1973. He received the Srimanta Sankardeva-Madhabdeva Award in 1994. In 2000, the Assam government bestowed the Srimanta Sankaradeva Award on him. In 2005, he was awarded as Jorhat Ekalabya and Dalit Daradi by North Eastern Research Organization. A Gandhian in life, Sutiya was a student of Class X, when he saw Gandhiji for the first time and met him personally later in Maharashtra.

Literary works

He began writing 1939 after he joined the Dharma Mahasabha. His books were highly influenced by Sankari Culture and Mahapusia Dharma. Most of them were related to Vishnuism in Assam. Until his death, he wrote various books and articles in many different Assamese magazines. In 1954, he published his first book "Naam Dharma Prakash".

Books wrote by Sonaram Sutiya:

 Naam Dharma Prakash (1954 )
 Mahapurush Haridev Charit (1968 )
 Axomor Vaisnav  DarshanorSwarnarekha (1971 )
 Bikhudgarror Bichitra Kahani ( 1976 )
 Mundan ( 1978 )
 Bhagawat Mahatyama ( 1984 )
 Mahapusia Dharma Jigyassa ( 1986 )
 Ved aaru Mahapusia Dharma ( 1988 )
 Axomor Satra : Ek Anuhandhan ( 2003 )               
  Aami Bhagawanor Dakh (2003)
 Vakti Ratnawali
 Huvor Okhodhi
 Ishwaror Sabbyabyapita
 Mahapusia Dharma aru Karmakando

See also
 List of people from Assam

References

1915 births
2013 deaths
People from Jorhat district
Cotton College, Guwahati alumni
Indian independence activists from Assam